Megacaphys is a monotypic snout moth genus containing the species Megacaphys titana. It was described by William Schaus in 1904, originally under the genus Caphys, and was subsequently moved to Megacaphys by George Hampson in 1916. It is found in Mexico.

References

Moths described in 1904
Chrysauginae
Monotypic moth genera
Moths of Central America
Pyralidae genera